is a railway station on the Kyoto Municipal Subway Karasuma Line in Kita-ku, Kyoto, Japan.

History
The station opened on May 29, 1981 when the Karasuma Line started operation between Kitaōji and Kyoto. Until October 24, 1990, the station was the terminus of the line.

Layout
This station has an island platform with two tracks under Karasuma Street.

Platforms

Surroundings
Kitaōji Town
Kyoto City Kitaōji Bus Terminal
Kyoto North Hall
Kitaoji Vivre
Otani University
Ritsumeikan Primary School
Kyoto Botanical Garden

Kyoto City Kitaōji Bus Terminal
Bus Platform A for Kyoto Sangyo University
Route 北3 for Kamigamo Shrine and Kyoto Sangyo University
Non-stop buses to Kyoto Sangyo University
Bus Platform B for Higashiyama Street and Takano
Route 204 for Takano and Ginkaku-ji via Shirakawa Street
Route 206 for Chion-in, Gion, Kiyomizu-dera and Kyoto Station via Higashiyama Street
Bus Platform C for Kawaramachi Street
Route 1 for Rakuhoku High School, Shimogamo Shrine and 
Route 37 for Shijo Kawaramachi and  via Kawaramachi Street
Route 205 for Rakuhoku High School, Shimogamo Shrine, Shijo Kawaramachi and Kyoto Station
Bus Platform D for Takano and Shugakuin-michi
Route 北8 for Takano and Shugakuin-michi
Bus Platform E for Sembon Kitaoji and Bukkyo University
Route 1 for Daitoku-ji and Bukkyo University
Extra route for Bukkyo University
Route 北1 for Bukkyo University and Gentaku
Route 37 for Nishigamo Depot via Horikawa Street
Route 特37 for Omiya Kotsu-koen and Nishigamo Depot
Bus Platform F for Sembon and Nishioji
Route 101 Raku Bus for Daitoku-ji, Kinkaku-ji, Kitano Tenman-gu, Nijō Castle and Kyoto Station
Route 102 Raku Bus for Daitoku-ji, Kinkaku-ji, Kitano Tenman-gu and Ginkaku-ji
Route 205 for Daitoku-ji, Kinkaku-ji and Nishioji Shijo via Nishioji Street
Route M1 for Haradani
Route M1 for Ritsumeikan University
Route 北8 for Bukkyo University and Matsugasaki
Bus Platform G for Sembon and Nishioji
Route 204 for Daitoku-ji, Kinkaku-ji and Nishinokyo Emmachi via Nishioji Street
Route 206 for Shijo-Omiya and Kyoto Station via Sembon Street

Karasuma Kitaōji Intersection 
Kyoto City Bus (Karasuma Kitaōji)
Route 1 for Demachiyanagi via Shimogamo Shrine / for Bukkyo University and Nishigamo Depot
Route 37 for Shijo Kawaramachi and Sanjo Keihan via Kawaramachi Street / for Kitaoji Bus Terminal and Nishigamo Depot
Route 204 for Takano and Ginkaku-ji via Shirakawa Street / for Daitoku-ji, Kinkaku-ji and Nishinokyo Emmachi via Nishioji Street
Route 205 for Shijo Kawaramachi and Kyoto Station via Kawaramachi Street / for Daitoku-ji, Kinkaku-ji and Nishioji Shijo via Nishioji Street
Route 206 for Chion-in, Gion, Kiyomizu-dera and Kyoto Station via Higashiyama Street / for Shijo-Omiya, Kyoto Aquarium and Kyoto Station via Sembon Street
Route 北3 for Kyoto Sangyo University
Route 北8 for Takano and Shugakuin-michi
Kyoto Bus (Kitaōji Ekimae)
Route 30 and Express Route 36 for Demachiyanagi via Izumojibashi
Route 32 for Hirogawara via Kibuneguchi, Kurama and Hanasetoge / for Demachiyanagi via Takanobashi-higashizume
Route 34 for Shizuhara and Shiroyama via Kyoto Sangyo University  / for Demachiyanagi via Takanobashi-higashizume
Route 35 for Ichihara via Kyoto Sangyo University / for Demachiyanagi via Takanobashi-higashizume
Route 45 for Kyoto Station via Karasuma Street / for Iwakura-Muramatsu via Rakuhoku University and Midorogaike
Route 46 for Iwakura-Muramatsu via Rakuhoku University and Midorogaike
Kumogahata Bus Mokumoku-go (Kitaōji Ekimae)
for Kumogahata (2 round-trips per day, between Kitaoji Ekimae and Kumogahata Iwayabashi)

References

Railway stations in Kyoto Prefecture